Örsundsbro is a locality situated in Enköping Municipality, Uppsala County, Sweden with 1,386 inhabitants in 2019. 

Together with the nearby locality Örsundsbro Norra, the population reaches 1,953 inhabitants in the whole of Örsundsbro in 2019.

References 

Populated places in Uppsala County
Populated places in Enköping Municipality